Robert Bent Knox  (25 September 1808 – 23 October 1893) was the Church of Ireland Bishop of Down, Connor and Dromore from 1849 to 1886, and then Archbishop of Armagh and Primate of All Ireland from 1886 until his death.

Early life
Born in 1808 at Dungannon Park, County Tyrone, the country seat of his grandfather, Thomas Knox, 1st Viscount Northland (d. 1818), Knox was the second son of the Hon. Charles Knox (d. 1825), Archdeacon of Armagh, and his wife, Hannah, the daughter of Robert Bent . His uncles were the bishops William Knox and Edmund Knox, his niece was the writer Kathleen Knox.

Educated at Trinity College, Dublin, he took the degree of Bachelor of Arts at the age of twenty-one, then graduated MA in 1834. He was also awarded the degree of Doctor of Laws by Cambridge in 1888.

Career
In 1832, Knox was ordained deacon and priest by Bishop Beresford of Kilmore. On 7 May 1834 he became chancellor of Ardfert. On 16 October 1841 he was collated as prebendary of St Munchin's, Limerick, by his uncle Edmund Knox, Bishop of Limerick, who also made him his domestic chaplain.

In 1849 he became a Doctor of Divinity and was appointed Bishop of Down, Connor and Dromore. In 1886, he was created Archbishop of Armagh. He was succeeded in Down, Connor and Dromore by William Reeves.

Knox was nominated to the see of Down, Connor, and Dromore by George Villiers, 4th Earl of Clarendon, at the time Lord Lieutenant of Ireland. Samuel Wilberforce later reported in his diary for 26 August 1861, some gossip about this appointment; James Henthorn Todd had said of Knox that he was "…very foolish, without learning, piety, judgment, conduct, sense, appointed by a job, that his uncle should resign Limerick", while Anthony La Touche Kirwan (Dean of Limerick, died 1868), said that Knox "…used, when made to preach by his uncle, to get me to write his sermon, and could not deliver it".

Nevertheless, Knox was the author of various ecclesiastical and secular works.

Knox made no secret of his view that disestablishment in Ireland was inevitable. As Bishop of Down, Connor, and Dromore, he hoped to build a new cathedral in Belfast, but abandoned this plan in favour of another, to increase the number of churches of the united diocese. He founded the Belfast Church Extension Society in 1862 and through it achieved forty-eight new or enlarged churches.  He organized diocesan conferences and founded a Diocesan Board of Missions.  In 1867, in the House of Lords, he proposed a reduction of the hierarchy of the Church of Ireland to just one archbishop and five bishops. In person, he was quiet and restrained, pragmatic and frank, and an able administrator and an effective speaker.

Following the death of Marcus Gervais Beresford, Archbishop of Armagh, on 26 December 1885, Knox was chosen as his successor. As president of the General Synod of the Irish church he was seen as fair and moderate.  He died at the archbishop's palace, Armagh, on 23 October 1893, and was buried on 27 October in the old ruined church at Holywood. There is also a memorial to him in the north aisle at St Patrick's Cathedral, Armagh.

Family
On 5 October 1842, Knox married Catherine Delia FitzGibbon, daughter of Thomas Gibbon FitzGibbon of Ballyseeda, County Limerick. They had three sons, including Charles Edmond Knox, who became a lieutenant-general of the British Army, and also two daughters.

Selected publications
Ecclesiastical Index [of Ireland] (1839)
Fruits of the revival, in Steane's Ulster Revival (1859)

Notes

Sources

1808 births
1893 deaths
Alumni of Trinity College Dublin
Anglican archbishops of Armagh
Bishops of Down, Connor and Dromore
19th-century Anglican archbishops
People from County Tyrone